Campo de Jogo, English title Sunday Ball, is a 2015 Brazilian documentary film directed by Eryk Rocha.

Synopsis
In the shadow of Maracana Stadium in Rio de Janeiro, 14 soccer teams from the favelas compete in soccer matches.

Release
The film received its North American premiere on 20 February 2015 at the Museum of Modern Art. On 3 May 2015, the film will be featured at the San Francisco International Film Festival.

References

External links

Campo de Jogo at Museum of Modern Art
Jay Weissberg, Variety review "Not Just a Sports Documentary"
BFI London Film Festival entry
Facebook page
Trailer at YouTube

2015 films
2015 documentary films
Brazilian documentary films
Documentary films about association football
2010s Portuguese-language films